This is a list of electoral district results for the 1913 New South Wales state election.

If a candidate failed to achieve at least 50% of the vote in an electorate, a run-off election would take place in the following weeks. In this election, 12 electorates proceeded to second round elections, while 3 were uncontested.

Election results

Albury

Alexandria

Allowrie

Annandale

Armidale

Ashburnham

Ashfield

Balmain

Bathurst

Bega

Belmore

Bingara

Bondi

Botany

Burrangong

Burwood

Byron

Camden

Camperdown

Canterbury

Castlereagh

Cessnock

Clarence

Cobar

Cobar was significantly expanded, absorbing most of the abolished district of The Darling, including the town of Bourke.

Cootamundra

Corowa

Darling Harbour

Darlinghurst

Drummoyne

Dulwich Hill

Durham

Enmore

Glebe

Gloucester

Gordon

Gough

Goulburn

Granville

Gwydir

Hartley

Hastings and Macleay

Hawkesbury

Hurstville

Kahibah

King

Lachlan

Leichhardt

Lismore

Liverpool Plains

Lyndhurst

Macquarie

Maitland

John Gillies died in 1911. The by-election in October 1911 was won by Charles Nicholson who retained the seat at the 1913 general election.

Marrickville

Middle Harbour

Monaro

Mosman

Mudgee

Murray

Murrumbidgee

Namoi

Newcastle

Newtown

Orange

Paddington

Parramatta

Petersham

Phillip

Raleigh

Randwick

Redfern

Rozelle

Ryde

St George

St Leonards

Singleton

Sturt

Surry Hills

Tamworth

Robert Levien was the sitting member.

Tenterfield

Upper Hunter

The sitting member was Henry Willis who stood as an independent, describing himself as a radical liberal.

Wagga Wagga

Wallsend

Wallesend largely replaced the abolished district of Waratah, held by John Estell.

Waverley

Wickham

Willoughby

Willyama

Wollondilly

Wollongong

Woollahra

Yass

Robert Donaldson was the sitting member for Wynyard which had been largely replaced by Yass.

See also
 1913 New South Wales state election
 Candidates of the 1913 New South Wales state election
 Members of the New South Wales Legislative Assembly, 1913–1917

Notes

References

1913